Denis Myšák (born 30 November 1995) is a Slovak sprint canoeist. He competes in K-4 events and won a gold medal at the 2015 World Championships and a silver medal at the 2016 Summer Olympics.

Career
He took up the sport at age eight. Because of his successes in junior category, he was named Slovak Junior Kayaker of the Year in 2012 and 2013. At the 2013 European Junior and U23 Championships he won a gold medal in K-2 500 metres junior race with Tibor Linka. Next year, again with Linka, they finished second in the U23 race. In 2015 he became part of Slovak K-4 team, which had won many medals at the Olympic Games, World and European Championships. With Erik Vlček, Juraj Tarr and Tibor Linka, they won K-4 1000 metres race at the 2015 World Championships. In 2016, the same team won one gold and one silver medal at the 2016 European Championships, showing good form before the main objective of the season, the Olympic Games, where they competed in the K-4 1000 m category as the reigning World Champions and won the silver medal.

Other
Denis Myšák is representing the Slovak Republic in the 2021 Mister Globe Pageant on 20 June 2021.

References

External links

 
 
 
 

1995 births
Living people
Olympic canoeists of Slovakia
Slovak male canoeists
Sportspeople from Bojnice
ICF Canoe Sprint World Championships medalists in kayak
Canoeists at the 2016 Summer Olympics
Canoeists at the 2020 Summer Olympics
Medalists at the 2016 Summer Olympics
Medalists at the 2020 Summer Olympics
Olympic medalists in canoeing
Olympic silver medalists for Slovakia
Olympic bronze medalists for Slovakia